Vaessen is a Dutch patronymic surname. Vaes, modern spelling Vaas of Faas, was a short form of the given name Servaas (after Saint Servais). Variant forms are Faassen, Faessen, Vaassen, Vaes, and Vaesen. Notable people with the surname include:

Elly Coenen-Vaessen (1932-2020), Dutch VVD politician and mayor of Nuth (1986–1997)
Etienne Vaessen (born 1995), Dutch football goalkeeper
Ilse Vaessen (born 1986), Dutch badminton player
Jos Vaessen (born 1944), Belgian businessman
Leon Vaessen (born 1940), English footballer
Marie-Louise Vaessen (1928–1993), Dutch swimmer
Paul Vaessen (1961–2001), English footballer, son of Leon
Step Vaessen (born 1965), Dutch broadcast journalist
Vaesen
Daan Vaesen (born 1981), Belgian football defender
Nico Vaesen (born 1969), Belgian football goalkeeper
 (born 1974), Belgian singer and radio presenter known as Niels William
Vaes
Stefaan Vaes (born 1976), Belgian mathematician
Wouter Vaes, Dutch darts player
Faassen
 (1833–1907), Dutch stage actor and playwright

References

Dutch-language surnames
Patronymic surnames

de:Vaessen
nds:Vaessen